The World Cup and European Championship, are the primary competitive tournaments the England national football team enters. The finals of both tournaments held every four years in alternate even numbered years. Excluding the tournament years in which England either did not enter or failed to qualify for the finals, the England national team has nominated the following squads of players to compete in the finals:

1950 World Cup

 Progress: Group round 1

Head coach: Walter Winterbottom

1954 World Cup

 Progress: Quarterfinals

Head coach: Walter Winterbottom

Only 17 of the 22 official squad members actually travelled to Switzerland for the 1954 tournament.  Five players—Ken Armstrong, Allenby Chilton, Johnny Haynes, Harry Hooper and Bedford Jezzard—were put on reserve status and remained at home awaiting a call if the need arose.  It did not.

1958 World Cup

 Progress: Group round 1

Head coach: Walter Winterbottom

Some sources state that England took only 20 squad members to the 1958 tournament in Sweden, and their squad lists do not include Alan Hodgkinson or Maurice Setters.  Other sources, including FIFA's official World Cup records, list 22 players on the squad and include both Hodgkinson and Setters.  The likelihood is that these two players were included on the squad list submitted to FIFA but did not travel to the tournament.

1962 World Cup

 Progress: Quarterfinals

Head coach: Walter Winterbottom

Some sources state that only 20 of the 22 squad members travelled to the 1962 tournament in Chile, that Gordon Banks and Derek Kevan were stay-at-home reserves who were never called.

1966 World Cup

 Progress: Winners

Manager: Alf Ramsey

1968 European Championship

 Progress: Third place

Head coach: Alf Ramsey

1970 World Cup

 Progress: Quarterfinals

Head coach: Alf Ramsey

1980 European Championship

 Progress: Round 1

Head coach: Ron Greenwood

1982 World Cup

 Progress: Group round 2

Head coach: Ron Greenwood

Note that this squad is numbered alphabetically by surname, unlike traditional numbering systems.  Despite this the goalkeepers are given the usual England goalkeepers' shirts 1, 13 & 22 (again alphabetically) and Kevin Keegan is given his favoured 7.

1986 World Cup

 Progress: Quarterfinals

Head coach: Bobby Robson

1988 European Championship

 Progress: Round 1

Head coach: Bobby Robson

1990 World Cup

 Progress: Fourth place

Head coach: Bobby Robson

* David Seaman was originally selected, but after arriving in Italy, he had to pull out of the squad due to a thumb injury and was replaced by Dave Beasant.

1992 European Championship

 Progress: Round 1

Head coach: Graham Taylor

1996 European Championship

 Progress: Semifinals

Head coach: Terry Venables

1998 World Cup

 Progress: Round of 16

Head coach: Glenn Hoddle

2000 European Championship

 Progress: Round 1

Head coach: Kevin Keegan

2002 World Cup

 Progress: Quarterfinals

Head coach:  Sven-Göran Eriksson

2004 European Championship

 Progress: Quarterfinals

Head coach:  Sven-Göran Eriksson

2006 World Cup

 Progress: Quarterfinals

Head coach:  Sven-Göran Eriksson

2010 World Cup

 Progress: Round of 16
Head coach:  Fabio Capello

A provisional 30-man England squad for the 2010 World Cup was announced on 11 May 2010. This was then reduced to the official 23-man squad, announced on 1 June 2010. The seven players dropped from the provisional squad were Leighton Baines, Darren Bent, Michael Dawson, Tom Huddlestone, Adam Johnson, Scott Parker and Theo Walcott. Dawson was subsequently called up after a knee injury to captain Rio Ferdinand.

2012 European Championship

 Progress: Quarterfinals
Head coach: Roy Hodgson

Roy Hodgson announced England's 23-man squad on 16 May 2012, along with a five-man stand-by list. The England team is the only squad to consist entirely of players from their domestic league. On 25 May, John Ruddy was ruled out with a broken finger; Jack Butland was called up as his replacement. On 28 May, Gareth Barry was ruled out with a groin injury, being replaced by Phil Jagielka. On 31 May, Frank Lampard was ruled out with a thigh injury and was replaced by Jordan Henderson. On 3 June, Gary Cahill was ruled out with a double fracture of his jaw and Martin Kelly was called up as his replacement.

2014 World Cup

 Progress: Group stage
Head coach: Roy Hodgson

England's final squad was announced on 12 May 2014, including seven standby squad members: John Ruddy, Jon Flanagan, John Stones, Michael Carrick, Tom Cleverley, Andy Carroll and Jermain Defoe. Of those seven, only Stones and Flanagan joined the rest of the squad at a training camp in Portugal, with Stones serving as a like-for-like replacement option for Phil Jones, who was still recovering from a shoulder injury. Both Stones and Flanagan travelled with the squad to their pre-tournament training base in Miami, and are expected to remain with the team in Brazil should any injuries be suffered ahead of the opening game. The squad numbers were revealed on 22 May.

2016 European Championship

 Progress: Round of 16
Head coach: Roy Hodgson

England named their final squad on 31 May.

2018 World Cup

 Progress: 4th Place

Head coach: Gareth Southgate

England's final squad was announced on 17 May 2018, including five standby squad members: Lewis Cook, Tom Heaton, Adam Lallana, Jake Livermore, and James Tarkowski.

2020 European Championship

 Progress: Second place 
Head Coach: Gareth Southgate

England announced a 33-man preliminary squad on 25 May 2021. Mason Greenwood withdrew injured on 1 June, with the final squad announced later that day. Trent Alexander-Arnold withdrew injured on 3 June, and was replaced by Ben White on 7 June.

2022 World Cup

Coach: Gareth Southgate

England's final squad was announced on 10 November 2022 for the 2022 World Cup in Qatar. Ben White withdrew from the squad on 30 November due to personal reasons.

See also
 England national football team results (1966 onwards)
 List of England international footballers (by years/caps/goals) (25 caps and over)
 List of England international footballers (alphabetical)
 England at the FIFA World Cup
 England at the UEFA European Championship

References

S
squads
squads